The 1970 Wisconsin Badgers football team represented the University of Wisconsin in the 1970 Big Ten Conference football season.

Schedule

Game summaries

Penn State

Roster

1971 NFL Draft

References

Wisconsin
Wisconsin Badgers football seasons
Wisconsin Badgers football